Saint-Jacques was a village in New Brunswick until it was amalgamated into the city of Edmundston in 1998.

Neighbourhoods in Edmundston
Former villages in New Brunswick
Populated places disestablished in 1998